Sphenophryne similis is a species of frog in the family Microhylidae. It is endemic to New Guinea and is only known from its type locality in the Owen Stanley Range, Northern Province, Papua New Guinea.

It was relatively common. There are no known threats facing it.

References

similis
Amphibians of New Guinea
Amphibians of Papua New Guinea
Endemic fauna of New Guinea
Endemic fauna of Papua New Guinea
Amphibians described in 2000
Taxa named by Richard G. Zweifel
Taxonomy articles created by Polbot